George Wilson (30 June 1916 – 27 April 1995) was an Irish first-class cricketer.

Born at Ligoniel near Belfast, Wilson received his education at Belfast Technical College. Playing his club cricket for Woodvale in Belfast, Wilson made his debut in first-class cricket for Ireland against Scotland at Glasgow in 1948. He made two further first-class appearances for Ireland, both against Scotland in 1949 at Belfast, and 1951 at Dublin. Across his three matches, Wilson scored a total of 116 runs at an average of 19.33, with a highest score of 39. He also took two wickets. Outside of cricket, he worked as draughtsman in an engineering company. He died at Glengormley in April 1995.

References

External links

1916 births
1995 deaths
Cricketers from Belfast
Irish cricketers